Megachile rhododendri is a species of bee in the family Megachilidae. It was described by Theodore Dru Alison Cockerell in 1927.

References

Rhododendri
Insects described in 1927